Durgen is an unincorporated community in Lewis County, in the U.S. state of Missouri.

History
Durgen was platted in 1860. The community took its name from nearby Durgens Creek. A post office called Durgen's Creek was established in 1855, the name was changed to Durgen in 1895, and the post office closed in 1905.

References

Unincorporated communities in Lewis County, Missouri
Unincorporated communities in Missouri